Martin Nielsen (12 December 1900 in Gødvad – 1962), was a Danish politician, managing editor, member of parliament for the Communist Party of Denmark and Holocaust survivor.

Before his election to the Danish parliament (Rigsdag) he was a dairyman and farmworker.

Martin Nielsen had a wife and a son.

Later in life he became a member of the Folketing and managing editor.

Internment 

On 22 June 1941, just hours after the commencement of Operation Barbarossa, Danish police arrested Martin Nielsen and around 300 other members of the Communist Party of Denmark (DKP). On the 20 August, he and 106 of the arrested men in Copenhagen were deported from Vestre Prison to the Horserød camp. In December 1942, the Danish authorities handed him and his file over to the Gestapo for interrogation.

On 29 August 1943, following the German dissolution of the Danish government, German occupation forces took command of the internment camp where the Danish authorities held Martin Nielsen.

On 2 October 1943, he was deported as part of a group of 150 communists to Stutthof concentration camp, on the ship Wartheland via Swinemünde and by cattle car.

On 25 January 1945, Nielsen was marched from Stutthof.

On 10 March 1945, he was liberated by the Red Army, which sent him (part of the way on foot) to Moscow, from where he was repatriated.

Bibliography

Notes

1900 births
1962 deaths
Danish male novelists
Members of the Folketing
Stutthof concentration camp survivors
Communist Party of Denmark politicians
Farmworkers
20th-century Danish novelists